Tami Kamzel is an Israeli international lawn bowler.

Bowls career
Kamzel won a triples silver medal (with Irit Grenchel and Naomi Fix), at the 2005 Atlantic Bowls Championships. In 2011, she won a bronze medal at the European Bowls Championships in Portugal.

Kamzel was selected as part of the five woman team by Israel for the 2020 World Outdoor Bowls Championship Previously she had represented Israel at four more World Championships; the 2000 World Outdoor Bowls Championship, the 2004 World Outdoor Bowls Championship, the 2012 World Outdoor Bowls Championship and the 2016 World Outdoor Bowls Championship.

References

Israeli female bowls players
Living people
Year of birth missing (living people)